Longcross railway station is next to Longcross Garden Village (Upper Longcross) in Surrey, England. It straddles the former parishes of Virginia Water and Lyne and Longcross (a current civil parish) in part of the large wooded sandy heath known as Surrey Heath, larger than the district of the same name.

History
The station was opened  by the Southern Railway. Originally named Longcross Halt, it was not shown in regular timetables until 21 September 1942. On 5 May 1969 it was renamed Longcross by British Rail.

Since the May 2022 timetable change, trains stopping at this station have increased to a regular half-hourly frequency similar to other stations on the Waterloo–Reading line. This reflects the development of Longcross Garden Village nearby.

Location
The station provides access to Longcross Garden Village, and the adjacent Longcross film studios. The station is not by a road but has a short, broad path to residential roads: Burma Road and Churchill Drive. 

To the north is Wentworth Golf Course, lacking any rights of way (accessways) between it and the station. The station is thus adjacent to parts of the Wentworth Estate and, beyond the M3 motorway, Chobham Common.

Services
The off-peak Monday to Saturday service at the station is:
 2 trains per hour to London Waterloo via Richmond
 2 trains per hour to 

On Sundays the service reduces to hourly in each direction.

References

External links

  - Video covering a visit to the station.

Railway stations in Surrey
DfT Category C2 stations
Former Southern Railway (UK) stations
Railway stations in Great Britain opened in 1942
Railway stations served by South Western Railway
Railway stations in Great Britain without road access
1942 establishments in England